Calmus or CALMUS may refer to:

Calmus, Saeul, Luxembourg
Călmuș River, tributary of the river Tazlăul Sărat in Romania
Dick Calmus (born 1944), American baseball player
Rocky Calmus (born 1979), American footballer
CALMUS, composing software created by Icelandic composer Kjartan Ólafsson
Calmus, Leipzig vocal quintet founded by Martin Lattke 1999

See also
Calamus (disambiguation)